Ryan King (born 28 June 1997) is a Italy international rugby league footballer who last played as a  for Whitehaven RLFC in the Betfred Championship.

Background
King was born in Wollongong, New South Wales, Australia. He is of Italian descent. 

He played junior rugby league for Wests Illawarra Devils.

Playing career

Club career
King joined the Cronulla-Sutherland Sharks in 2017 and played for their NRL Under-20s team.

Ryan King played in 26 games, and scored 14 tries for the for Whitehaven in the 2022 RFL Championship.

International career
In 2022 King was named in the Italy squad for the 2021 Rugby League World Cup.

References

External links
Italy profile

1997 births
Living people
Australian rugby league players
Australian people of Italian descent
Sportspeople of Italian descent
Halifax R.L.F.C. players
Italy national rugby league team players
Italy national rugby league team captains
Rugby league players from Wollongong
Rugby league second-rows
Whitehaven R.L.F.C. players